Little York is an unincorporated community in Butler Township, Montgomery County, Ohio, United States. It is located on the east bank of the Stillwater River, at the intersection of Little York Road and Meeker Road, not far from the intersection of I-70 and Ohio State Route 48.

History
Little York was platted in 1817 by Andrew Waymire. A post office in the community called Little York was established in 1824, the name was changed to Littleyork in 1895, and the post office closed in 1901. Besides the post office, Little York had a mill and distillery.

References 

Unincorporated communities in Montgomery County, Ohio
Unincorporated communities in Ohio